The Panama City Beach Classic was a golf tournament on the Nike Tour. It ran from 1990 to 1994. It was played at Hombre Golf Course in Panama City, Florida.

Winners

Bolded golfers graduated to the PGA Tour via the final Nike Tour money list.

References

Former Korn Ferry Tour events
Golf in Florida
Panama City, Florida
Recurring sporting events established in 1990
Recurring events disestablished in 1994
1990 establishments in Florida
1994 disestablishments in Florida